José Eulalio Loyola Fernández (born 1941 in Cienfuegos, Cuba) is a Cuban composer, professor and flutist.

Academic background

José Loyola began to study flute with his father, Efrain Loyola, and continued at a later time, in 1963, at the National Art Schools with professors Juan Pablo Ondina and Emigdio Mayo. In 1967, Loyola concluded his médium level music studies and received instruction from renowned North American professor Federico Smith.

In 1967, Loyola received a scholarship to study musical composition at the Warsaw Superior School of Music, with professors Grażyna Bacewicz, Andrzej Dobrowolski and Witold Rudzinski. In 1973 he concluded his studies and, from 1981 to 1985, he continued at the  Frédéric Chopin Academy at Warsaw, where he received a Doctorate in Music.

Professional activity
José Loyola began his artistic career as a flutist in the orchestra of his father, Efraín Loyola, and at that time he made arrangements for other famous musical groups such as the Elio Revé, Pancho el Bravo and "Modelo" orchestras.

Loyola worked as professor of composition and orchestration, as well as a member of the "Commission of Scientific Degrees" at the Instituto Superior de Arte (La Habana). He also collaborated with the Music Sections of the Brigada Hermanos Saiz and the National Union of Writers and Artists of Cuba (UNEAC), and participated as a juror in the UNEAC composition contests of 1975 and 1976.

In Poland, José Loyola worked as a flutist and arranger for the Quartet of Polish pianist Frederyk Babinski, with which he participated in the festivals "Jazz Jamboree", from Warsaw, and "Jazz from Oder", in the city of Wrocław as well as in the Komeda Festival. With the Babinsky Quartet, Loyola participated in recording the sound track of several Polish films.
 
Loyola actively participated in numerous international cultural events, such as the Simposium about Opera, Ballet and Musical Theatre in Sofia, Bulgaria, in 1976; the Colloquium about Black Civilization and Education in Lagos, Nigeria, in 1977; the Gathering of Music directors and composers from the Socialist Countries in Moscow, Russia, in 1977;  the International Collocquium about Music in Buenos Aires, Argentina, in 1988; the International Collocquium about the Bambuco in México, in 1990; the International Collocquium about the Bolero in Venezuela, 1994 and 1995. In 1987, he founded the "Golden Boleros" Festival organized by the National Union of Writers and Artists of Cuba (UNEAC). 

Most recently, José Loyola has created the "Charanga de Oro", a musical ensemble which structure is based in the classical format of the "Charanga francesa", which emerged during the first years of the 20th century derived from the "Orquesta típica", or wind ensemble.

Awards and recognitions
 Annual Award for the totality of his work. (1992)
 "Juan Marinello" Order, (1996)
 "Alejo Carpentier" Medal, (2002)

Works

Piano
 Tres piezas cubanas. For percussion.
 Música viva núm. 1.

Chamber music
 Construcción, Ensamblaje, for brass ensemble
 Música, for flute and strings, 1970
 Música viva núm. 4, for chamber orchestra 
 Música de cámara, 1975; Pas de deux, for flute and oboe
 Sinfonietta, for string orchestra, wind quintet and piano 
 Trío, for oboe, clarinet and bassoon 

Instrumental ensemble
 Canción del soy todo II, text: Eloy Machado, for oboe, narrator and Afro-Cuban percussion 
 Canto negro, text: Nicolás Guillén, for baritone, mixed choir, piano and percussion
 Homenaje a Brindis de Salas, for violin solo
 Música viva núm. 3, for flute and Afro-Cuban percussion 
 Poética del Guerrillero, text: Carlos Pellicer, for trumpet, choir and string orchestra 
 Tres imágenes poéticas, for baritone, piano and percussion instruments

Symphony Orchestra
 Música viva núm. 2 
 Música viva núm. 3
 Textura sonora, 1979
 Tropicalia

Choir
 Antipoemas, text: Nicanor Parra
 Cinco poemas, for mixed choir 
 Variaciones folklóricas, for baritone, choir, piano and percussion 

Opera
 Monzón y el rey de Koré, 1973, based on an African story

See also
 Music of Cuba

References

External links
 YouTube: José Loyola y la Charanga de Oro, Otra Vez La Habana: https://www.youtube.com/watch?v=9aIK-KZIcBo
 YouTube: Preludio Y Tumbao (José Loyola Fernández) Cascadia Composers 170519-0 wolftraks: https://www.youtube.com/watch?v=14pG6IIJtg0

Living people
1941 births
20th-century classical composers
20th-century male musicians
Cuban classical composers
Cuban composers
Male composers
Latin music composers
Male classical composers
People from Havana
Cuban male musicians